Grand-Zattry (also known as Zadieguhé) is a town in south-western Ivory Coast. It is a sub-prefecture and commune of Soubré Department in Nawa Region, Bas-Sassandra District.

In 2021, the population of the sub-prefecture of Grand-Zattry was 112,049.

Villages
The twenty four villages of the sub-prefecture of Grand-Zattry and their population in 2014 are:

References

Sub-prefectures of Nawa Region
Communes of Nawa Region